The 2018 Winter Paralympics Torch Relay was a 8-day event leading up to the 2018 Winter Paralympic Games in Pyeongchang. It began on March 2, 2018, in Seoul and concluded at the Games' opening ceremony on March 9. It is held entirely within South Korea, the host country

Route

See also
 2012 Summer Paralympics torch relay
 2014 Winter Paralympics torch relay
 2016 Summer Paralympics torch relay
 2022 Winter Paralympics torch relay

References

Torch relay
Paralympic torch relays